Todd Carey is an American singer-songwriter and record producer. He is known for his hit song "Nintendo" from the "Future Throwback" album, released in 2016. The "Nintendo" music video proceeded the album's release and garnered over one million views on YouTube. He then followed with the full-length album "Future Throwback" in 2016, which debuted in the Apple Top 20. Born and raised near Chicago, Illinois, he later relocated to Los Angeles to attend the University of Southern California for a degree in music. After graduation, Carey launched his music career as a solo artist, eventually moving to back to Chicago. He focused on his solo career in Chicago, then later in New York City where he currently resides. He has since released three solo albums and two EPs. His 2010 EP, After The Morning After debuted in the iTunes Top 40 Pop Charts.

He has toured nationally and performed on stage with such artists as Fall Out Boy, The 1975, Echosmith, Jason Mraz, John Mayer. His music has been featured in various television shows and movies, such as MTV's The Real World and the movies Palo Alto and True Confessions of a Hollywood Starlet.

Early life

Todd Carey was born and raised in Winnetka, Illinois, a suburb north of Chicago. He is the first of two children born to Christine, a teacher/fashion designer, and Richard, an attorney.  Growing up, his mother would not let him or his sister watch television but would encourage Carey's interest in music. His mother was a former musician, having attended the Cincinnati Conservatory of Music for music education. His father was also a music lover and collected music, introducing Carey to artists like Stevie Wonder and Miles Davis at a young age.

Carey's own interest in music began as a child and he credits Elvis Presley, The Beatles for inspiring him to learn to play guitar. He bought a guitar with money he saved, but wasn't serious about playing until he began taking guitar lessons a few years later. Carey played through middle school and high school, eventually starting a band in high school called the "Heart of Gold Band" with friends. Their name inspired by Grateful Dead's song "Scarlet Begonias", the group was a jam band and was additionally influenced by the likes of the Dave Matthews Band and Phish.

The University of Southern California and Telepathy

After graduating from New Trier High School in Winnetka, Carey would attend the University of Southern California for a Jazz Guitar major and an English minor on a partial scholarship. Shortly after arriving, he formed another jam band, Telepathy, with other USC students. For five years, Telepathy played at local gigs and eventually moved up to playing at the Knitting Factory, The Mint and the House of Blues in Los Angeles. Telepathy would release three live albums and an EP through local indie label Kufala Recordings. During his time in college he also played a small part in the movie A Mighty Wind, which filmed scenes near USC.

Telepathy dissolved after Carey and the other members graduated from USC. By then Carey was performing solo shows and working on his own material when he decided to pursue a solo career in music. He taught guitar lessons to support himself and recorded his debut solo album, Elevate, that was released through Kufala Recodings in 2003. A year after playing solo in Los Angeles, Carey moved back to Chicago to focus on his career there.

Chicago and Watching Waiting

In Chicago, Carey worked to establish himself as a local artist and played frequent gigs in area venues. He released another self-produced album, Revolving World, through Kufala in 2005 and supported the album with a college tour. He continued to support himself financially teaching guitar lessons and playing at clubs while he compiled a new collection of demos.  This time he sent out the demos to producers and got the attention of Marshall Altman. The two agreed to work together and so Carey planned to fly out to Burbank, California to record with Marshall at his Galt Line studio.

Before the recording session, Altman asked Carey to record his version of the album with just an acoustic guitar so Altman could hear the album's raw form. Carey agreed and drove up to his family's summer cabin in Sturgeon Bay, Wisconsin to record these bare versions over a week and a half. The trip also provided new material, when an experience during recording lead Carey to write the song "Watching Waiting". The song would become the title track of the album. A selection of these acoustic versions would later be packaged into the Whitefish Bay Sessions EP.

Returning to California to record Watching Waiting with Marshall Altman, Carey asked if his friend Eric Robinson (whom he knew from USC) could sit in during the recording session. Altman agreed and the meeting began a working partnership between Altman and Robinson that would last for many years. A friend of Robinson, the then-unknown Sara Bareilles, also appeared on the album providing background vocals. The album was produced independently but Carey was able to secure a distribution deal with Universal Music's distribution company, High Wire Music/Fontana, after recording. Promotion was also provided through Aware Records' street team. It was Carey's first album available in major retail stores and was also offered through a digital "pay what you feel" release on Carey's website.

Following the release of Watching Waiting in 2007, Carey began various tours to support the album.  He did opening and co-headlining tours with Bushwalla, Brendan James, Curtis Peoples and other artists. Bushwalla would introduce Carey to the Bob Schneider songwriting game "The Challenge", where Carey would participate in off and on stints. During this time his music was featured in the 2007 film Palo Alto and on MTV's The Real World. Carey supported his music in the movie Palo Alto with a college tour, playing concerts while screening the film at various universities. Touring in support of the album Watching Waiting would continue for the next two years and included a co-headlining "Three of Hearts Tour" in 2008 with Jonathan Clay and Alexa Wilkinson. After the "Three of Hearts Tour" he opened for Brendan James and Jason Reeves in a series of West Coast shows.

New York and After the Morning After

In 2009 Carey moved to Brooklyn, New York to continue and expand his music career in a new market. Setting up his recording studio in Park Slope, he worked on creating new material for another album. He explored the New York music scene and began stockpiling songs that he again wrote and produced himself. Carey originally planned to self-release and produce his next album but this changed following a trip to Los Angeles. Carey had heard of producer Mikal Blue through tourmate Brendan James, who had produced James' last album, and went to meet with him. Carey visited Blue's Revolver studio with a burned CD of songs he had been working on. Blue responded well to the songs and they began to work together, quickly producing a full album's worth of material.

Originally a full-length album, the release was later cut down to become the After the Morning After EP. The first release from the Mikal Blue material was the March 30, 2010 single "Gotta Be Next To You", which featured vocals from Amber Rubarth.  This was followed up by the iTunes release of After The Morning After EP on May 25, 2010, where it debuted in the top 40 on the iTunes charts. In December 2010, he released the self-produced Christmas single "Perfect Christmas Day" and followed it with a co-headlining holiday tour, the "You'll Shoot Your Eye Out Tour", with Josh Hoge.

In 2011, Carey released the stand-alone single "Begin", a song that came from the Mikal Blue tracks that had been cut from After The Morning After EP.  Later that year in September, Rock Ridge Music/ADA/Warner Music Group announced that it had signed Carey to their record label and would work on his next album release.

Personal life

Carey started a charity foundation, Todd4Tatas, to benefit breast cancer after his mother was diagnosed with the disease.  Proceeds from the "You'll Shoot Your Eye Out" tour went toward the foundation.

Discography
 Revolving World (2005)
 Whitefish Bay Sessions EP (2007)
 Watching Waiting (2007)
 After the Morning After EP (2010)
 Future Throwback (2016)

References

External links
 Todd Carey Official Site
 Todd Carey on Facebook
 Todd Carey on YouTube
 Todd Carey on Twitter

Living people
American male singer-songwriters
Singers from Chicago
People from Winnetka, Illinois
People from Whitefish Bay, Wisconsin
USC Thornton School of Music alumni
Year of birth missing (living people)
Singer-songwriters from Illinois
Singer-songwriters from Wisconsin